Vohemar Airport  is an airport in Vohemar, Sava Region, Madagascar.

Airlines and destinations

References

Airports in Madagascar
Sava Region